Joyce Benignia Van Patten (born March 9, 1934) is an American film and stage actress. She is best known for her roles in films like The Bad News Bears (1976), St. Elmo's Fire (1985) (as Mrs. Beamish), and as Gloria Noonan in Grown Ups (2010).

Personal life
Van Patten was born in New York City to Josephine Rose (née Acerno), a magazine advertising executive, and Richard Byron Van Patten, an interior decorator. Her mother was of Italian descent, while her father was of Dutch and English ancestry.

She is the younger sister of actor Dick Van Patten, and the half-sister of actor/director Tim Van Patten and actor John Van Patten. Following a relatively brief marriage to Thomas King at the age of 16 (she gave birth to a son, Thomas Jr., a year later), she married and divorced three more times, including to actor Dennis Dugan. She was married to actor Martin Balsam from 1959 to 1962, and they had a daughter, actress Talia Balsam.

Career
Van Patten has appeared in dozens of television series. She was a member of the original cast of As the World Turns. She made her television debut as a featured regular on The Danny Kaye Show, after which she co-starred with Bob Denver and Herb Edelman in the 1968–70 sitcom The Good Guys as Claudia Gramus, the long-suffering wife of diner owner Bert Gramus (played by Edelman). She appeared in two episodes of Perry Mason ("The Case of the Prankish Professor" and "The Case of the Thermal Thief"). She appeared in guest or recurring roles on Stoney Burke, Hawaii Five-O, Gunsmoke (as bar girl "Molly" in "Anybody Can Kill a Marshal" - S8E26), The Untouchables, The Law and Mr. Jones, The Twilight Zone ("Passage on the Lady Anne"), The Jack Benny Program, Family Affair, The Many Loves of Dobie Gillis, The Andy Griffith Show, Mr. Novak, The Outer Limits, Mannix, The Rockford Files, The Bob Newhart Show, The Odd Couple, The F.B.I., Lou Grant, Law & Order, Oz, and The Sopranos. On a 1976 episode of Columbo, "Old Fashioned Murder", Van Patten played the lead, as a museum owner and curator who commits murder. In 1974, she had a minor role in the episode "Negative Reaction" (with Dick Van Dyke) of the same series. In 1979, she starred as Iris Chapman in The Mary Tyler Moore Hour, and appeared in The Martian Chronicles the following year. In 1995, she played Maureen, Jennie's mother, for two seasons on the WB sitcom Unhappily Ever After. In 2005, she played Carol Prudy, Susan Mayer's stepmother, on two episodes of Desperate Housewives.

Her film credits include I Love You, Alice B. Toklas (1968), The Trouble with Girls (1969), Pussycat, Pussycat, I Love You (1970), Making It (1971), Something Big (1971), Bone (1972), Thumb Tripping (1972), Mame (1974), The Manchu Eagle Murder Caper Mystery (1975), The Bad News Bears (1976), Mikey and Nicky (1976), The Falcon and the Snowman (1985), St. Elmo's Fire (1985), Billy Galvin (1986), Blind Date (1987), Monkey Shines (1988), Grown Ups (2010), This Must Be the Place (2011), and God's Pocket (2014). In 2018 she appeared in the short film The Rest.

Theatre
At age 9, Van Patten made her stage debut in Tomorrow, the World!. She appeared on Broadway in, among other shows, A Hole in the Head, Brighton Beach Memoirs, Murder at the Howard Johnson's, Rumours, Jake's Women and Rabbit Hole. She appeared off-Broadway in such dramas as Love, Loss, and What I Wore, The Vagina Monologues, and Chekhov's The Seagull. She also appeared and recorded, with Charles Aidman and Naomi Caryl Hirschhorn, excerpts from Spoon River Anthology.

Filmography

References

External links
 
 
 Joyce Van Patten at Internet off-Broadway Database

1934 births
Actresses from New York City
American child actresses
American film actresses
American stage actresses
American television actresses
American people of Italian descent
American people of Dutch descent
American people of English descent
Living people
20th-century American actresses
21st-century American actresses
Van Patten family